Lincoln Homestead and Cemetery, also known as the Jacob Lincoln House, is a historic home and cemetery located near Broadway, Rockingham County, Virginia. It was built in two sections.  The main section was built about 1800, and is a two-story, five bay, brick structure with a side gable roof.  It features an elaborate wooden cornice with Wall-of-Troy molding, corbels and dentils, and a Federal style doorway.  The two-story brick rear ell was built in 1849 and joined to the main house in the early-1900s.  Located on the property is the Lincoln family cemetery in which are buried five generations of the family, as well as Queenie, a woman who was enslaved by the Lincoln family, and "Virginia John" Lincoln, great-grandfather of Abraham Lincoln.

It was listed on the National Register of Historic Places in 1972.

In November 2019, the house was purchased by Benjamin and Sarah Bixler after being vacant for 20 years. The new owners completed a combination of restoration and renovations on the house in 2021.

References

External links
 Lincoln Homestead website
 Lincoln Society of Virginia
 

Lincoln family
Houses on the National Register of Historic Places in Virginia
Cemeteries on the National Register of Historic Places in Virginia
Federal architecture in Virginia
Houses completed in 1800
Houses in Rockingham County, Virginia
National Register of Historic Places in Rockingham County, Virginia